These are the results for the mixed doubles badminton tournament of 2000 Summer Olympics. The tournament was single-elimination. Matches consisted of three sets, with sets being to 15 for mixed doubles. The tournament was held at Pavilion 3, Sydney Olympic Park.

Seeds
  (silver medalist)
  (quarterfinals)
  (second round)
  (fourth place)
  (bronze medalist)
  (quarterfinals)
  (gold medalist)
  (quarterfinals)

Results

Draw

Final

Top half

Bottom half

References

External links 
 2000 Sydney Olympic Games – Mixed doubles

Badminton at the 2000 Summer Olympics
2000
Mixed events at the 2000 Summer Olympics